Brăila County is a county (județ) of Romania, in Muntenia, with the capital city at Brăila.

Demographics 

In 2011, Brăila had a population of 304,925 and the population density was 64/km2.

 Romanians – 98%
 Romani, Russians, Lipovans, Aromanians and others -  2%

Geography 
This county has a total area of 4,766 km2.

All the county lies on a flat plane: the Bărăgan Plain, one of the best areas for growing cereals in Romania.

On the east side there is the Danube, which forms an island – The Great Brăila Island surrounded by the Măcin channel, Cremenea channel and Vâlciu channel.  On the northern side there is the Siret River and on the north-western side there is the Buzău River.

Neighbours 

 Tulcea County in the east.
 Buzău County in the west.
 Galați County and Vrancea County in the north.
 Ialomița County and Constanța County in the south.

Economy 
The agriculture is the main occupation in the county.  Industry is almost entirely concentrated in the city of Brăila.

The predominant industries in the county are:
 Food industry.
 Textile industry.
 Mechanical components industry.

In Brăila there is an important harbour, once the biggest cereal harbour in Romania.

Tourism 

The main tourist destinations are:
 The city of Brăila.
 The Lacu Sărat Resort.

Politics
The Brăila County Council, renewed at the 2020 local elections, consists of 30 counsellors, with the following party composition:

Administrative divisions 

Brăila County has 1 municipality, 3 towns and 40 communes
Municipalities
Brăila – capital city; population: 210,400 (as of 2007)
Towns
Făurei 
Ianca
Însurăței

Communes
Bărăganul
Berteștii de Jos
Bordei Verde
Cazasu
Chiscani
Ciocile
Cireșu
Dudești
Frecăței
Galbenu
Gemenele
Grădiștea
Gropeni
Jirlău
Mărașu
Măxineni
Mircea Vodă
Movila Miresii
Racovița
Râmnicelu
Romanu
Roșiori
Salcia Tudor
Scorțaru Nou
Siliștea
Stăncuța
Surdila-Găiseanca
Surdila-Greci
Șuțești
Tichilești
Traian
Tudor Vladimirescu
Tufești
Ulmu
Unirea
Vădeni
Victoria
Vișani
Viziru
Zăvoaia

Historical county

Historically, the county was located in the southeastern part of Greater Romania, in the northeastern part of the Muntenia region. Its territory included the portions of the current county to the east and south-east of the Buzău River. It was bordered on the west by the counties of Buzău and Râmnicu-Sărat, to the north by Covurlui County, to the east by Tulcea County, and to the south by the counties of Constanța and Ialomița.

Administration

The county was originally divided administratively into four districts (plăși):

Plasa Călmățui, with headquarters at Făurei
Plasa Ianca, with headquarters at Ianca
Plasa Silistraru, with headquarters at Silistraru
Plasa Viziru, with headquarters at Viziru

Subsequently, Plasa Călmățui, was abolished and two new districts were established in its place:
Plasa I.I.C. Bratianu, with headquarters at Făurei
Plasa Vădeni, with headquarters at Vădeni

Population 

According to the 1930 census data, the county population was 219,831 inhabitants, ethnically divided as follows: 89.4% Romanians, 3.1% Jews, 2.2% Greeks, 0.7% Hungarians, 0.6% Russians, as well as other minorities. From the religious point of view, the population was 93.6% Eastern Orthodox, 3.3% Jewish, 1.2% Roman Catholic, as well as other minorities.

Urban population 
In 1930, the county's urban population was 68,347 inhabitants, comprising 75.4% Romanians, 9.7% Jews, 6.7% Greeks, 1.7% Hungarians, 1.6% Russians, as well as other minorities. Mother tongues among the urban population were Romanian (82.6%), Greek (5.8%), Yiddish (4.8%), Russian (1.9%), Hungarian (1.5%), as well as other minorities. From the religious point of view, the urban population was composed of 84.4% Eastern Orthodox, 10.4% Jewish, 3.2% Roman Catholic, as well as other minorities.

References

 
Counties of Romania
1879 establishments in Romania
1938 disestablishments in Romania
1940 establishments in Romania
1950 disestablishments in Romania
1968 establishments in Romania
States and territories established in 1879
States and territories disestablished in 1938
States and territories established in 1940
States and territories disestablished in 1950
States and territories established in 1968